Stara Baška  is a village located on the island of Krk in Croatia.

References

Populated places in Primorje-Gorski Kotar County
Krk